Kulangār/ Kolangar (Dari: کلنگار, Pashto: کلنګار) is a village in Pul-i Alam District, Logar province, Afghanistan.

Name 
The folk etymology behind the name Kulangār is for it to having to do with a story about a crane (Persian: kulang, کلنگ). The more likely origin of the name however are the Dardic words kul meaning "tribe" and aṅgār meaning "fire", making up the meaning "fire tribe". This origin may be a relic of the Dardic languages native to the region in pre-Islamic times.

The Shrine of Malik Sabz Ali 
In Kulangar lies the shrine of Malik Sabz Ali ibn Malik Yusuf (died 1541 CE). The site is a popular place of pilgrimage, attracting visitors from around the province.

References 

Populated places in Logar Province